"Top of the World" is a song performed by Electronic Music producer Khwezi and singer Johnny Apple. It was released on 17 April 2015 as a digital download in South Africa. Khwezi received his first award nomination as a solo artist when Top of the World was nominated for Song of the Year and Best Male at the OFM awards.

Track listing

Release history

Charts

References

2015 singles
2015 songs